Kyrre Nilsen (born 22 January 1970) is a retired Norwegian football striker.

Starting his career in Ballstad, he joined Gevir Bodø in 1992. He then went on to second-tier Bodø/Glimt in 1993, returned to Gevir after only a few months, but in 1994 he commenced a second spell in Bodø/Glimt, now in Eliteserien. After 8 league games in 1994 and 0 in 1995 he returned to Gevir ahead of the 1996 season. He moved south after the 1997 season to pursue an administrative job at the University of Oslo and play part-time for Mercantile.

References

1970 births
Living people
People from Vestvågøy
Norwegian footballers
FK Bodø/Glimt players
Eliteserien players
Association football forwards
Sportspeople from Nordland